The Ąžuolpamūšė hillfort, also known as the Dabužiai hillfort, as is an archaeological site in Pasvalys district municipality, Lithuania near the village of . It includes a Semigallian hillfort and a settlement site. It is located on a high point by the confluence of Tatula  and  rivers.

Dated back to 9-13th centuries, in May 1998 it was declared to be a cultural monument of Lithiania.

See also
List of hillforts in Lithuania

References

Hill forts in Lithuania
Pasvalys District Municipality